

Portugal
 Angola – 
 Adrião da Silveiro Pinto, Governor-General of Angola (1848–1851)
 António Sérgio de Sousa, Governor-General of Angola (1851–1853)

United Kingdom
 Bahamas – John Gregory, Governor of the Bahamas (1849–1854)
Malta Colony
Richard More O'Ferrall, Governor of Malta (1847–1851)
Robert Ellice, Acting Governor of Malta (1851)
William Reid, Governor of Malta (1851–1858)
 New South Wales – Lieutenant Colonel Charles FitzRoy, Governor of New South Wales (1846–1855)
 South Australia – Sir Henry Fox Young, Governor of South Australia (1848–1854)
 Western Australia – Captain Charles Fitzgerald, Governor of Western Australia (1848–1855)

Colonial governors
Colonial governors
1851